The United States District Court for the Eastern District of Louisiana (in case citations, E.D. La.) is a United States federal court based in New Orleans.

Appeals from the Eastern District of Louisiana are taken to the United States Court of Appeals for the Fifth Circuit (except for patent claims and claims against the U.S. government under the Tucker Act, which are appealed to the Federal Circuit).

, the United States Attorney for the Eastern District of Louisiana is Duane A. Evans.

Jurisdiction 
This district comprises the following parishes: Assumption, Jefferson, Lafourche, Orleans, Plaquemines, St. Bernard, St. Charles, St. James, St. John the Baptist, St. Tammany, Tangipahoa, Terrebonne, and Washington.

History 
On March 26, 1804, Congress organized the Territory of Orleans and created the United States District Court for the District of Orleans—the only time Congress provided a territory with a district court equal in its authority and jurisdiction to those of the states. The District was thereafter subdivided and reformed several times.

After the United States District Court for the Canal Zone was abolished on March 31, 1982, all pending litigation was transferred to the Eastern District of Louisiana.

Current judges 
:

Vacancies and pending nominations

Former judges

Chief judges

Succession of seats

See also 
 Courts of Louisiana
 List of current United States district judges
 List of United States federal courthouses in Louisiana
 United States Court of Appeals for the Fifth Circuit
 United States District Court for the Middle District of Louisiana
 United States District Court for the Western District of Louisiana

References

External links 
 U.S. District Court for the Eastern District of Louisiana

Louisiana, Eastern District
Louisiana law
New Orleans
Houma, Louisiana
Courthouses in Louisiana
1823 establishments in Louisiana
1845 disestablishments in Louisiana
1849 establishments in Louisiana
1866 disestablishments in Louisiana
1881 establishments in Louisiana
Courts and tribunals established in 1823
Courts and tribunals disestablished in 1845
Courts and tribunals established in 1849
Courts and tribunals disestablished in 1866
Courts and tribunals established in 1881